Americana is an album by singer and songwriter Leon Russell.  The album peaked at # 115 on the US charts Billboard 200. The album was first released as a vinyl LP Album by Leon's new label Paradise Records. Americana was re-released on CD by Wounded Bird Records in 2007 and again in 2012 by Ais. The album was by produced by Leon Russell.

The new releases were after Leon recordings earned six gold records. He received two Grammy awards from seven nominations. In 2011, Leon was inducted into both the Rock and Roll Hall of Fame and the Songwriters Hall of Fame. One of his biggest early fans, Elton John, said Russell was a "mentor" and an "inspiration". They recorded their album The Union in 2010, which earned them a Grammy nomination.

Track listing
All songs performed by Leon Russell. All tracks composed by artist listed below.

Side one
Let's Get Started - (Kim Fowley, Leon Russell) -	4:12
Elvis And Marilyn (Dyan Diamond, Kim Fowley, Leon Russell) - 	3:04
From Maine To Mexico (Kim Fowley, Leon Russell) -	3:09
When A Man Loves A Woman (A. Wright, C. Lewis) - 	3:22
It's Only Me (Dyan Diamond, Leon Russell) - 	2:20

Side two
Midnight Lover (Kim Fowley, Leon Russell) - 	4:08
Housewife (Dyan Diamond, Kim Fowley, Leon Russell) - 	3:02
Ladies Of The Night (Kim Fowley, Leon Russell) - 	3:03
Shadow And Me (Leon Russell) - 	3:06
Jesus On My Side (Kim Fowley, Leon Russell) - 	3:04

Charts

Personnel
Leon Russell 	- Audio Production, Bass, Bass Instrument, Composer, Guitar, Keyboards, Main Personnel, Piano, Primary Artist, Producer, Vocals
Joe Chemay 	- Bass, Bass Instrument, Main Personnel, Vocals, Vocals (Background)
Marty Grebb - Guitar, Main Personnel, Saxophone, Trumpet
Wornell Jones 	- Vocals, Vocals (Background)
Joe Chemay - Backing Vocals
Lee Loughnane - Horn Arrangements, Trumpet
Mike Meros 	- Keyboards, Organ, Synthesizer
Brent Nelson - Drums, Main Personnel, Vocals (Background)
James Pankow 	- Trombone
Walter Parazaider 	- Sax (Tenor), Saxophone, Vocals
Mark Peters 	 -Orchestral Arrangements
Jon Woodhead	- Guitar
Frank Latouf - Technician
Mike Johnstone - Technician
Steve Marr  - Technician
Tom Kemp - Technician
Photography  – Paul Hodara
Recorded By – Gene Meros and Steve Ripley
Scott Goddard -    Other

References

External links

Leon Russell discography
Leon Russell lyrics
Leon Russell Records
Leon Russell NAMM Oral History Program Interview (2012)

1978 albums
Leon Russell albums
Albums produced by Leon Russell